Walter Kjellberg (10 October 1901 – 14 September 1955) was a Finnish sailor. He competed in the 8 Metre event at the 1936 Summer Olympics.

References

External links
 

1901 births
1955 deaths
Finnish male sailors (sport)
Olympic sailors of Finland
Sailors at the 1936 Summer Olympics – 8 Metre
Sportspeople from Turku